Barranca de Oblatos, also known as Barranca de Huentitán, is a canyon carved by the Río Grande de Santiago in Mexico in the state of Jalisco. It lies on  the northeast side of the municipality of Guadalajara and on the edge of the municipalities of Tonalá, Zapotlanejo, Ixtlahuacán del Río and Zapopan in the Guadalajara Metropolitan Area. Its beauty and structure make it a slightly smaller scale version of the Grand Canyon in the United States, and Barranca del Cobre in Chihuahua.

This canyon is also named Oblatos-Huentitán due to the areas in the city crossed by it, called Oblatos and Huentitán respectively.

Human history

Several important events in the history of Guadalajara occurred in the canyon. In the 19th century, during the Spanish Conquest combat between the indigenous natives of Huentitán and the Spaniards took place in this area. This was also the location of many battles of the Mexican Revolution and Cristero War.  But perhaps the most interesting story about this canyon is that of a flooding that took place during the Porfiriato era (1876-1911).

Protected area

The Canyon is considered a biogeographic corridor since it is home to several types of vegetation: Tropical Forest, Deciduous, Riparian forest vegetation and secondary vegetation. Several species of flora and fauna are endemic to the canyon. It is often visited by national and international investigators since it includes great biological diversity. 
On June 5, 1997 the canyon was declared a Nature reserve, under the category of Zone subject to Ecological Conservation Protected Area by the World Conservation Union of all the area belonging to the Guadalajara Metropolitan Area because it is the most urbanized area. Great Horned Owls, Collared Peccaries, Bobcats, Gray Foxes, Opossums, Red-tailed Boas, Barn Owls, Leaf Cutter Ants and Vampire Bats are among the species making a home in the canyon.
There are several urbanized areas that cover the eastern side of the canyon, complexes such as the University of Guadalajara campus of the CUAAD Center of Art, Architecture and Design, the Guadalajara Zoo, and the now closed Guadalajara Planetarium. In addition to several residential areas, there are also sporting and recreational facilities that include soccer fields, basketball, tennis and fronton courts, picnic spaces, a running strip, a recreational park and an outdoor theater. There were plans to build the next Guggenheim Museum in early 2008, the controversial Arcediano dam project and a high-rise project called Puerta Guadalajara (Guadalajara Gate) which would have included a shopping mall, a convention center, two hotels, two museums, 9 residential towers and two more corporate towers. None of these projects were started and it seems likely that they have now all been cancelled or postponed indefinitely. However, work is in progress on the construction of an art museum in the Mirador park, on the site formerly intended for the Guggenheim museum project.

References

External links
Barranca de Oblatos at TripAdvisor.com
The Birds of Barranca de Oblatos - 1958 survey By ROBERT K. SELANDER and DONALD R. GILLER, of UTA

Nature reserves in Mexico
Canyons and gorges of Mexico
Landforms of Jalisco
Tourist attractions in Jalisco
Río Grande de Santiago
Protected areas of Jalisco